The 1916 Tusculum Pioneers football team represented Tusculum College  during the 1916 college football season. The team was led by  head coach J. Bruce Anderson. The team's first game of the season was a loss to future SIAA champion Tennessee.

Schedule

References

Tusculum
Tusculum Pioneers football seasons
Tusculum Pioneers football